Healthy Together is a proprietary health technology company that builds SaaS technology for government, education and enterprise. The platforms use is to increase the reach and efficacy of program initiatives, improve health equity and reduce cost. Software is available in the United States of America with current deployments in Utah, Florida, Oklahoma and Colorado. The United States Department of Veterans Affairs also utilizes Healthy Together's mobile platform to provide over 18 million Veterans with digital access to their health information.

Healthy Together's mobile application has reached #1 in the App Store Health & Fitness category and has over 225k reviews on the App Store and Play Store with a 4.9/5 star rating.

Development
Healthy Together launched in March 2020 and specializes in building software for public health and health and human services departments. Their technology aids in areas such as disease surveillance, behavioral health management and benefit enrollment for programs like Medicaid, Supplemental Nutrition Assistance Program and WIC. 

The Florida Department of Health began using the platform in September of 2020 to deliver real-time test results to residents. Over 50% of households in Florida have adopted the mobile application. On December 6th 2022, the Advanced Technology Academic Research Center (ATARC) awarded Healthy Together and the State of Florida's Department of Health with a Digital Experience Award at their 2022 GITEC Emerging Technology Award Ceremony in Washington, D.C. to recognize success of the project. The partnership was also highlighted on the Federal News Network's show Federal Drive.

Colorado currently utilizes Healthy Together’s technology to support WIC benefit recipients statewide. The platform is also used at universities in Utah and Oklahoma with plans to expand to other states and enterprise customers.

In November of 2022, the United States Department of Veterans Affairs and Healthy Together announced a collaboration to expand access to health records for Veterans. The platform provides 18 million Veterans with access to their health information through their smartphones and mobile devices. In December of 2022, the integration was recognized as one of Healthcare IT News' Top 10 stories of 2022.

Privacy
Systems are HIPAA compliant and System and Organization Controls certified.

Data is encrypted in transit and at rest. Internal infrastructure is continuously audited via Center for Internet Security benchmarks to ensure customer data is private and secure.

References

External links
 Official Website
 Government CIO Outlook 

Application software
COVID-19 contact tracing apps
COVID-19 pandemic in Utah